The Upper Canada District School Board (UCDSB), known as English-language Public District School Board No. 26 prior to 1999) is one of the largest public school boards in Ontario in terms of geographical area.  It encompasses the counties in the easternmost portion of the province, including the cities of Brockville, Clarence-Rockland, Carleton Place, Cornwall, and Akwesasne. It covers most of the area surrounding - but not including - the city of Ottawa. Trustee elections are held periodically to elect new trustees. 

The board manages a main office in Brockville and four regional education centres, and offers alternate and continuing education at over 30 locations.  The board foresees an overall decline in student enrolment over the next 15 years, and has engaged in long-term strategic planning to address this issue.

Secondary & Elementary Schools

Secondary school enrollment (according to data from the Ontario Ministry of Education's School Information Finder service) and Fraser Institute provincial rankings are as follows:

Additionally, the Board operates the Eastern Ontario Education and Training Centre in Hawkesbury, along with Conseil des écoles publiques de l'Est de l'Ontario and Conseil scolaire district catholique de l'Est ontarien .

See also
Catholic District School Board of Eastern Ontario
Hastings and Prince Edward District School Board
List of school districts in Ontario
List of high schools in Ontario

References

School districts in Ontario
Education in Lanark County
Education in Leeds and Grenville United Counties
Education in the United Counties of Prescott and Russell
Education in the United Counties of Stormont, Dundas and Glengarry
Education in Brockville